Yousuf Khan (born 3 February 2002) is an Afghan cricketer. He made his List A debut for Nangarhar Province in the 2019 Afghanistan Provincial Challenge Cup tournament on 4 August 2019.

References

External links
 

2002 births
Living people
Afghan cricketers
Place of birth missing (living people)